NGC 144 is a spiral galaxy in the constellation Cetus (the Whale).

The galaxy was discovered in 1886 by Frank Muller.

External links 
 SEDS

References 

Astronomical objects discovered in 1886
473- G 023
-04-02-016
001917
Cetus (constellation)
0144
Spiral galaxies